Andrew Wright  (born 1971) is a Canadian multimedia artist based in Ottawa, Ontario.

Life
Wright was born 4 September 1971 in Cambridge, England. He holds a specialist degree in Art and Art History from the University of Toronto (1994) and a Masters in Fine Arts at the University of Windsor (1997).  Wright is currently associate professor in the Department of Visual Art at the University of Ottawa.

Work
Many of Wright's pieces have explored the nature of perception, photographic structures and technologies. His work, Home and Garden (Oakville Galleries, Oakville, Ontario 2002) presented the Gairloch Gardens in Oakville using three different photographic means: an antique camera lucida, a modern still camera and a video camera. The results, suggested by Elaine Hujer (Hamilton Spectator, 2003), are "so profoundly distinctive that viewers may be inspired to review, reinvestigate and reinterpret their own ideas about Oakville's stately lakeside manor."

Wright has also created several large-scale photographs by converting a large gallery space and his studio into a giant pin-hole camera. With reference to Wright's Skies piece, Kevin Temple suggests that this work, "is a meditation on modern photographic technology that's able to remove all traces of the process from the picture. Now automated cameras can eliminate the photographer entirely. By controlling his own process – in effect, avoiding its mechanization – Wright draws attention to the act of mediated representation."

Honours
 Winner of the inaugural BMW Prize in Photography, 2011
 OAAG (Ontario Association of Art Galleries) Award, Multi-Media, for the publication Blind Man's Bluff: 2006
 CFAP (Canadian Forces Artist Program) participant, 2005
 Winner of the Ernst & Young Great Canadian Printmaking Competition (2001)

Collections
Wright's work is held in the collections of the National Gallery of Canada, and of Canada House, the Canadian High Commission in London.

Selected bibliography
 Mark Cheetham, Water's Edge, Border Crossings Magazine (Canada) (Issue #103, Fall 2007)
 Robert Reid, The Wright Stuff, The Record (Waterloo Region) (May 19, 2007)
 Gary Michael Dault, Floating Around, Looking at Things, The Globe and Mail (April 24, 2004)
 Kevin Temple, No-Tricks Photography, Now Magazine (April 8, 2004)
 Gary Michael Dault, A Movie, An Experience, At One Remove, The Globe and Mail (June 14, 2003)
 Robert Reid, Video Sheds Funky New Light on Blind Man's Bluff, The Record (Waterloo Region), (May 24, 2003)
 Thomas Hirschmann, Sensory Deception: Two shows play tricks with sight and sound, Now Magazine (June 12, 2003)
 Elaine Hujer, A Garden of Illuminated Delights, Hamilton Spectator (January 11, 2003)

References

External links
 Audio interview  with Canadian Art magazine editor Richard Rhodes
 Official web site

1971 births
Living people
Artists from Cambridge
Artists from Ottawa
Canadian multimedia artists
English emigrants to Canada
Sheridan College alumni
Members of the Royal Canadian Academy of Arts